Victor Stanley Heron (1938/39 – 1 September 2020) was an Australian politician. He was the Labor member for Peake in the South Australian Legislative Assembly from 1989 to 1993.

References

 

1930s births
2020 deaths
Members of the South Australian House of Assembly
Australian Labor Party members of the Parliament of South Australia